Tuks FM is the radio station of the University of Pretoria and one of South Africa's community broadcasters. It was one of the first community broadcasters in South Africa to be given an FM licence. Previously renowned for its alternative rock music offering, the station underwent a musical transformation, where its playlist was changed to reflect the student population. Tuks FM is a volunteer, campus station, meaning that it is completely operated by students, save for upper management.

History
The station was formed in 1980 and had its first transmission on 9 February 1981, where it only broadcast to the Cafeteria and launched with a live performance from David Kramer.  Initially it broadcast only to the University of Pretoria main campus. In 1982-1984 broadcast points extended to all university residences as well as the Onderstepoort and Medical Campuses.

The station was awarded a one-month temporary broadcasting licence in February 1993 as well as a two-month temporary broadcasting licence in 1994.  On 24 April 1995 the station commenced its one-year broadcasting licence on the  107.2 FM stereo at 100 W in the greater Pretoria area.

Notable alumni
The station has produced a number of names in South African television, radio and journalism.

Radio:

 5FM: Gareth Cliff, Poppy Ntshongwana, Sias du Plessis, Grant Nash and Anele Mdoda, Kim Schulze, Rob Forbes, Nadia Romanos, Tim Zunckel, Zanele Potelwa, Kea Boya, Tshepi Seakamela.
MetroFM: Nthabeleng “MatElle” Matela.
 Jacaranda 94.2: Clayton Robbertze, Duncan Pollock, Francois Du Toit, Marius van der Walt, Liezel van der Westhuizen, Martine vd Walt, Antowan Nöthling, Robbie Kruse, Christine Greyvenstein, Nadine Moore, Janina Oberholzer, Ilze-Marie Meintjies, Anton Meijer, Catrine Malan, Pieter van der Merwe, Anine Dormehl, Wayne van Jaarsveld, Jacques du Preez, Hendrik Myburgh, Willem van Biljon.
 947 : Gloria Monaisa (Programming Director), Dineo Mphahlele (Newsreader), Carmen Reddy (Newsreader), Kriya Gangiah, Anele Mdoda, Alex Caige, Ayanda MVP, Francois “Frankie” Du Toit
 RSG DJ: Neil Saayman;
 Radio Pulpit DJ: Adriana Faling; 
 Classic FM DJ: Magz Kiko;
 702 Talk Radio presenters: Camilla Bath, Simon Dingle, Umayya Thebe and Dineo Mphahlele; Carmen Reddy; Tara Meaney
 Adsat Corporate Radio, Highveld Stereo and OFM: Justine Coley;
 Metro FM: Hlogi Mampuru a.k.a. Joe Man;
 Dubai 92: Rob Weston.
 OFM: Tim Zunckel (Programme Manager), Kenzy Vinco, Irene Fisher, Andre Kunz and Rian van Heerden, Martin van der Merwe, Duncan Bayne 
 East Coast Radio: Samson Oduntan
Algoa Fm: JD Mostert
 Smile FM: Christine Greyvenstein

Television:

 M-Net personnel (presenters, producers, etc.) Francois Nolte, Renier Roos and Victor Edward; Jacques Naude.
 kykNET: Retief van der Liefde (Actor) 
 SuperSport Sias du Plessis, Renier von Zeuner
 SABC personnel: Kim Schulze, Dineo Mphahlele, Duane Dell'Oca, Sarel van Vuuren, Tebogo Ramatjie, Victor Khasu and Vusi Ndala; Jenni Van Der Merwe
 CNBC Africa: Eleni Giocos, Fenley Foxen, Natascha Jacobsz
 e.tv: Kriya Gangiah

Listenership Figures

References

External links
 Tuks FM website
 Tuks FM Live Stream

Student radio stations in South Africa
University of Pretoria
Mass media in Pretoria